Greg Nichols (born 6 January 1959) is a former Australian rules footballer who played with Geelong in the Victorian Football League (VFL), and Glenelg in the South Australian National Football League (SANFL) in 1984. Nichols is now a director of Racing Victoria.

Notes

External links 
		

Living people
1959 births
Australian rules footballers from Victoria (Australia)
Geelong Football Club players
Cobram Football Club players